Le Plumard en folie (meaning "the crazy feather bed") (or Le Lit... Ze Bawdy Bed ) is a 1974 Canadian-French comedy film directed by Jacques Lemoine and Georges Combret and starring Alice Sapritch, Michel Galabru and Jacques Préboist.

Cast

References

Bibliography
 Gerald Pratley. A Century of Canadian Cinema. Lynx Images, 2003.

External links
 
 

1974 films
1970s sex comedy films
French sex comedy films
Canadian sex comedy films
1970s French-language films
Films directed by Georges Combret
1974 comedy films
French-language Canadian films
1970s Canadian films
1970s French films